Longquan Temple is a Taoist temple located in Panlong District, Kunming, Yunnan. The temple is renowned for its three ancient trees, namely the plum tree of Tang dynasty (618–907), cypress tree of the Song dynasty (960–1279) and tea of the Ming dynasty (1368–1644).

History
The original temple dates back to the 14th century, during the Yuan dynasty (1271–1368). The modern temple was founded by Taoist priest Xu Rixian in 1394, in the reign of Hongwu Emperor (1368–1398) of the Ming dynasty (1368–1644). During the Kangxi era (1662–1722) of the Qing dynasty (1644–1911), Fan Chengxun, Wang Jiwen and Xu Hongxun renovated the temple. In the Guangxu period (1875–1908), Cen Yuying and Du Ruilian redecorated the temple. In November 1993 it has been designated as a provincial level cultural heritage by the Yunnan Provincial Government.

Architecture
Now the existing main buildings include the Gate, Hall of the Thunder God, Hall of the Jade Emperor, and Hall of the Three Pure Ones.

Gallery

References

Taoist temples in Yunnan
Buildings and structures in Kunming
Tourist attractions in Kunming
14th-century establishments in China
14th-century Taoist temples
Religious buildings and structures completed in 1394